Simpulopsidae is a taxonomic family of air-breathing land snails, terrestrial pulmonate gastropod molluscs in the superfamily Orthalicoidea.

Taxonomy

2005 taxonomy 

This taxon was placed as the tribe Simpulopsini, in the subfamily Bulimulinae, within the family Orthalicidae, according to the taxonomy of the Gastropoda (Bouchet & Rocroi, 2005).

2012 taxonomy 
Breure & Romero (2012) elevated Simpulopsini to Simpulopsidae.

Genera 
Genera in the family Simpulopsidae include:
 Leiostracus Albers, 1850
 Rhinus Albers, 1860
 Simpulopsis Beck, 1837 - type genus of the tribe Simpulopsini
 subgenus Eudioptus Albers, 1860

References

External links